"G.O.D. Pt. III" is the third single from Mobb Deep's Hell on Earth album. The song contains an interpolation from "Tony's Theme" by Giorgio Moroder from the 1983 film Scarface, and a drum-loop from "Fool Yourself" by Little Feat. The title is a reference to The Godfather Part III. The chorus features Infamous Mobb member Godfather Pt. III.

The song is included on the best of album, Life of the Infamous: The Best of Mobb Deep.

The music video (directed by Steve Carr) takes place in an Opera House. Prodigy and Havoc take turns doing verses in different locations of the Opera House. The music video features a cameo appearance by Method Man.

Track listing

Side A 
"G.O.D. Pt. III" [Clean Version]
"G.O.D. Pt. III" [Instrumental]

Side B 
"G.O.D. Pt. III" [Dirty Version] (4:07)
"G.O.D. Pt. III" [Acappella]

Charts

References

External links 
 

1997 songs
Mobb Deep songs
Hardcore hip hop songs
Loud Records singles
Song recordings produced by Havoc (musician)
Songs written by Havoc (musician)
Songs written by Prodigy (rapper)